Komodo and Dragon by Komodo Chess (also known as Dragon or Komodo Dragon) are UCI chess engines developed by Komodo Chess, which is a part of Chess.com. The engines were originally authored by Don Dailey and GM Larry Kaufman. Dragon is a commercial chess engines, but Komodo is free for non-commercial use. Dragon is consistently ranked near the top of most major chess engine rating lists, along with Stockfish and Leela Chess Zero.

History

Komodo 

Komodo was derived from Don Dailey's former engine Doch in January 2010. The first multiprocessor version of Komodo was released in June 2013 as Komodo 5.1 MP. This version was a major rewrite and a port of Komodo to C++11. A single-processor version of Komodo (which won the CCT15 tournament in February earlier that year) was released as a stand-alone product shortly before the 5.1 MP release. This version, named Komodo CCT, was still based on the older C code, and was approximately 30 Elo stronger than the 5.1 MP version, as the latter was still undergoing massive code-cleanup work.

With the release of Komodo 6 on 4 October 2013, Don Dailey announced that he was suffering from an acute form of leukaemia, and would no longer contribute to the future development of Komodo. On October 8, Don made an announcement on the Talkchess forum that Mark Lefler would be joining the Komodo team and would continue its development.

On May 24, 2018, Chess.com announced that it has acquired Komodo and that the Komodo team have joined Chess.com. The Komodo team is now called Komodo Chess.

On December 17, 2018, Komodo Chess released Komodo 12.3 MCTS, a version of the Komodo 12.3 engine that uses Monte Carlo tree search instead of alpha–beta pruning/minimax.

The latest version, Komodo 14.1, was released on November 2, 2020.

Dragon 
On November 9, 2020, Komodo Chess released Dragon by Komodo Chess 1.0, which features the use of efficiently updatable neural networks in its evaluation function. Dragon is derived from Komodo in the same way that Komodo was derived from Doch. Dragon is also called Komodo Dragon in certain tournaments such as the Top Chess Engine Championship and the World Computer Chess Championship (WCCC) but not in the Chess.com Computer Chess Championship (CCC). A Chess.com staff member named Dmitry Pervov joined the Dragon development team to write the NNUE code for Dragon, and Dietrich Kappe joined the Dragon development team to help Larry Kaufman and Mark Lefter train Dragon's neural networks.

The latest version, Dragon 3.2, was released on December 17, 2022. On March 17, 2023, Larry Kaufman announced that he and Mark Lefter have stepped down from Dragon development and from ownership of Komodo Chess, and that Chess.com have taken full control of Komodo Chess. As of March 17, 2023, Dietrich Kappe is the only person responsible for the development of Dragon, but Chess.com are looking for more programmers to help with Dragon development.

Competition results

Komodo 
Komodo has played in the ICT 2010 in Leiden, and further in the CCT12 and CCT14. Komodo had its first tournament success in 1999, when it won the CCT15 with a score of 6½/7. Komodo also fared very well in the TCEC competition, where in Season 4, it lost only eight out of its 53 games and managed to reach Stage 4 (Quarterfinals), against very strong competition which were running on eight cores (Komodo was running on a single processor). In TCEC Season 5, it won the superfinal against Stockfish. It managed to reach the Superfinal in TCEC Season 6 again, but this time, it lost to Stockfish. Komodo regained the title in TCEC Season 7, defeating Stockfish in the superfinal. In TCEC Season 8, Komodo defeated Stockfish again in the superfinal. Komodo won both the World Computer Chess Championship and World Computer Software Championship in 2016. Komodo once again won the World Computer Chess Championship and World Blitz in 2017. Komodo came third in TCEC Season 11 losing to Stockfish and Houdini, and came second in Season 12 losing to Stockfish.

Chess.com Computer Chess Championship

Komodo MCTS

Dragon

Chess.com Computer Chess Championship

Top Chess Engine Championship

Notable games 

 Komodo vs Hannibal, nTCEC - Stage 2b - Season 1, Round 4.1, ECO: A10, 1–0 Komodo sacrifices an exchange for positional gain.
 Gull vs Komodo, nTCEC - Stage 3 - Season 2, Round 2.2, ECO: E10, 0–1

References

External links 
 

2010 software
Chess engines
Applied machine learning